The Kathryn Tucker Windham Museum is a biographical museum located on the campus of Coastal Alabama Community College in Thomasville, Alabama.  It is dedicated to preserving the works of native author, storyteller, and journalist Kathryn Tucker Windham.  Windham spent much of her life recording Alabama's history and folklore.  The museum was dedicated on June 1, 2003, Windham's 85th birthday.

Located in the College's library building, it includes a sculpture of Windham by Alabama folk artist Charlie Lucas.

References

External links
Kathryn Tucker Windham Museum, Official Website

Museums in Clarke County, Alabama
Windham, Kathryn Tucker
University museums in Alabama
Windham, Kathryn
Women's museums in Alabama
Museums established in 2003
2003 establishments in Alabama